Joseph M. Puthussery (born at Kalloppara on 28 April 1959) is an Indian politician. He serves as senior leader of the Kerala Congress.

Early life 
Puthussery entered politics as a student through K.S.C. He served as school unit secretary, vice president, All Kerala Balajana Sakhyam, State General Secretary and President, KSC; General Secretary, Kerala Youth Front and KTUC State Committee. He was a member, KSRTC Director Board, KSEB Consultative Committee, MG University Senate.

Career 
Following university, he was on Southern Railway Consultative Committee, District Sports Council, Pathanamthitta, Malankara Orthodox Church Managing Committee, MOC's Colleges Governing Body; Was Office Bearer, Transport Driver's Union; Electricity Board Executive Employees Union, Assistant Engineers Association, Coconut Development Corporation Staff Union.

He serves as General Secretary and Official Spokesman of Kerala Congress (M); Chairman, Mallappally Public Stadium Society. Was Secretary and Chief Whip of Kerala Congress (M) Parliamentary Party; Member, UDF State Co-ordination Committee.

At present, he is the vice-chairman of Kerala Congress.

He was elected to Kerala Legislative Assembly in 1991, 2001 and 2006 from Kallooppara constituency. He contested in the 2016 elections from Tiruvlla constituency but lost to Mathew T. Thomas. During his Tenure as MLA, he served as a member of the Privileges Committee, Public Undertaking Committee, Official Language Committee, Environment Committee, Rules Committee, Petitions Committee and Committee for the Welfare of Women and Children.

Puthusserry was a participant in the seven Annual General Assembly Sessions of the Inter Parliamentary Assembly on Orthodoxy (IAO) held at Greek Parliament (2013), Russian Parliament (2014), Vienna (2015), Thessaloniki (2016),  Italian Parliament (2017) Greek Parliament (2018)and Georgian Parliament(2019). IAO combines the efforts of European countries, with headquarters in the Greek Parliament. During his visit to the 2017 IAO General Assembly, he met with Pope Francis. He also met Prokopios Pavlopoulos, Greek President during the IAO 25th Annual General Assembly.

Since 2017 a column entitled 'Veenduvicharam' is being written in a Malayalam Daily.Three books 'Veenduvicharam' , 'Vimarsam' and 'Kalam Kannadi Nokkunnu' have been published.

References

Living people
1959 births
People from Pathanamthitta
Kerala Congress (M) politicians